The Krasts cabinet was the government of Latvia from 7 August 1997 to 26 November 1998.  It was led by Prime Minister Guntars Krasts.  It took office on 7 August 1997, after the resignation of Andris Šķēle.  It was replaced by the Krištopans cabinet on 26 November 1998, after the October 1998 election.

Government of Latvia
1997 establishments in Latvia
1998 disestablishments in Latvia
Cabinets established in 1997
Cabinets disestablished in 1998